Manauna is a village at Aonla tehseel in Bareilly district in the state of Uttar Pradesh, India.
 

Manauna is 1 km from Aonla. It is one of the more populated villages in Aonla tehseel in manauna many religions peoples live together as well as happily. Hindus celebrate janmasthmi and dussehra joyfully. It has a number of temples, including Brahma Dev Maharaj temple, which devotees from nearby places visit daily. There is also an Industrial training institute.

Very famous tomb of HAZRAT SHAHNOOR GAZi in Manauna on Aonla Bisauli Road. 

Villages in Bareilly district